Parivartana (translation:Change) is a 1975 Telugu romance film directed by K. Hemambaradhara Rao. The film was made under Subhashini Art Pictures
The film stars Krishnam Raju, Jamuna, Kanchana and Lakshmi in the lead roles. The music was composed by T. Chalapathi Rao. It is the debut film of Madhavapeddi Suresh, he played accordion for the film.

Cast
Krishnam Raju
Jamuna
Kanchana
Lakshmi
Chandra Mohan

Soundtrack
"Evaru Neevu Evaru Nenu"-
"Ontaritananiki Ika Selavu"-
"Gudilo Oka Deepam"-
"Cheyyi Choosi Chebutava Bava" -
"Medalona Murisevaaru" -
"Vinipinchana Vinipinchana"-

References

1975 films
Indian romance films
Films scored by T. Chalapathi Rao
1970s Telugu-language films
1970s romance films